Necla Hibetullah Sultan ( 14 September 1927 – 6 October 2006) was an Ottoman princess, the daughter Şehzade Ömer Faruk, the son of last caliph of the Abdulmejid II and Şehsuvar Hanım. Her mother was Sabiha Sultan, daughter of Sultan Mehmed VI and Nazikeda Kadın.

Early life
Necla Sultan was born on 14 September 1927 in Nice, France. Her father was Şehzade Ömer Faruk, son of Abdulmejid II and Şehsuvar Hanım, and her mother was Sabiha Sultan, daughter of Mehmed VI and Nazikeda Kadın. She was the youngest child of her parents. She had two sisters, Neslişah Sultan, six years older than her and Zehra Hanzade Sultan, four years older than her.

Upon the news of her birth, her paternal grandfather Abdulmejid, named her Hibetullah, whereas her maternal grandfather Mehmed, send a telegram from Sanremo, Italy conveying his blessings and naming her Necla. Hence her name was 'Necla Hibetullah'. However, some hours later another telegram arrived from San Remo, which turned the joyous day to unbearable suffering, Sultan Mehmed died after some hours after the birth of Necla, hence the day turned sorrowful.

Necla spend her childhood in France, Behzade Kalfa took care of Necla when she was young. As Behzade had cold relations with her grandfather, she did her competence to set her against her grandmother Şehsuvar, but despite this negative side she took care of Necla adroitly. In 1938, Necla, her parents and sisters moved to Egypt.

Marriage
In 1940, due to World War II Necla and her family was impoverished, as Abdulmejid wasn't able to send them money. The same year, her sisters married Egyptian princes, Neslişah married Prince Muhammad Abdel Moneim, and Hanzade married Prince Muhammad Ali, respectively.

In 1943, Necla married Egyptian prince, Amr Ibrahim in Cairo, Egypt, hence the three sisters were all married into the same dynasty, and were styled as "Egyptian princesses". The couple's only child, a son Prince Osman Rifat was born on 20 May 1951 in Cairo. In 1953, Necla, her husband and son settled in Switzerland, after the proclamation of Egypt as a republic in 1952.

Necla's father, Ömer Faruk developed an increased interest in his cousin Mihrişah Sultan, the daughter of crown prince Şehzade Yusuf Izzeddin. It was also a public knowledge that things were not going well between Faruk and her mother Sabiha. She and her sisters sided with their mother. Faruk accused Sabiha of turning their daughters against him. But he was already in love with Mihrişah and the issue of the council was just an excuse. In 1948, after twenty-eight years of marriage, Faruk divorced Sabiha, and married Mihrişah, After the revocation of the law of exile for princesses in 1952, her mother moved to Istanbul. Necla was widowed by the death of Amr Ibrahim in 1977.

Death
Necla Sultan died on 6 October 2006, at the age of eighty in Madrid, Spain. On 16 October her body was taken to Istanbul. The funeral took place in Bebek Mosque, and was attended by her eldest sister Neslişah, her son Osman Rifat, and other members of Ottoman dynasty. She was buried beside her mother and elder sister Hanzade in Aşiyan Asri Cemetery, Istanbul.

Honour
 Dame Grand Cross of the Order of the Eagle of Georgia

Ancestry

See also
 Prince Amr Ibrahim Palace

References

Sources

1926 births
2006 deaths
Muhammad Ali dynasty
20th-century Ottoman princesses
Egyptian royalty
Turkish emigrants to Egypt
Turkish emigrants to Switzerland
Swiss emigrants to Spain
20th-century Turkish women
21st-century Turkish women
Burials at Aşiyan Asri Cemetery